Bunodactis is a genus of sea anemones in the family Actiniidae.

Species
Species in the genus include:

 Bunodactis altifossa (Lager, 1911)
 Bunodactis aucklandica Carlgren, 1927
 Bunodactis bunodiformis (Hertwig, 1882)
 Bunodactis chrysobathys Parry, 1951
 Bunodactis conica (McMurrich, 1904)
 Bunodactis curacaoensis Pax, 1924
 Bunodactis elongata (McMurrich, 1904)
 Bunodactis glandulosa (Otto, 1823)
 Bunodactis hermaphroditica Carlgren, 1959
 Bunodactis inornata (Stimpson, 1856)
 Bunodactis maculosa Carlgren, 1954
 Bunodactis mortenseni (Carlgren, 1924)
 Bunodactis nikobarica Carlgren, 1928
 Bunodactis octoradiata (Carlgren, 1899)
 Bunodactis patagoniensis (Carlgren, 1899)
 Bunodactis reynaudi (Milne Edwards, 1857)
 Bunodactis rubripunctata (Grube, 1840)
 Bunodactis rubrofusca Carlgren, 1924
 Bunodactis spetsbergensis (Carlgren, 1902)

References

Actiniidae
Hexacorallia genera